Latino Youth High School (LYHS) is a Level 1 public charter high school that was established in 1974 as a program of Latino Youth, Inc. to address the problem of high dropout rates among children in the Pilsen / Little Village community.

History 
Latino Youth High School started as a division of Latino Youth, Inc. (originally Latino Youth Drug Intervention Program) when the non-profit sought to expand its services to youths who required a "second chance"  to obtain a high school diploma.  To that end, in 1985, an abandoned property at 2200 S. Marshall Boulevard was acquired (donated by the bank that owned it) and became a home to the high school. At this location, for over 25 years, the organization provided an array of social and educational services to over 5,000 students and their families each year. However, facing financial hardship the high school was acquired by another community non-profit, Pilsen Wellness Center, in 2005 and moved to its current location at 2001 S. California Avenue.

Notable persons 
Sandra Cisneros - an American writer best known for her acclaimed first novel The House on Mango Street is a former teacher at Latino Youth.
Daniel Solis - alderman of Chicago's 25th ward and a co-founder of Latino Youth. Alderman Solis is also the co-founder and Executive Director of the United Neighborhood Organization, which established the successful Chicago-based network of UNO Charter Schools.

Educational partners 
Latino Youth High School is a campus of the Youth Connection Charter School (YCCS), a member of the Alternative School Network (ASN) a division of Pilsen Wellness Center (PWC), and is recognized by the Illinois State Board of Education (ISBE). Latino Youth High School also receives funding and support from the Chicago Public Schools (CPS), The Department of Children and Family Services' (DCFS), and the Youth Development and Training Program (YSDTP).

References

External links

1974 establishments in Illinois
Charter schools in Chicago
Educational institutions established in 1974
Hispanic and Latino American culture in Chicago
Public high schools in Chicago
South Lawndale, Chicago